The 2021–22 season was the 51st season in the existence of Paris Saint-Germain Féminine and the club's 35th season in the top flight of French football. In addition to the domestic league, they participated in the Coupe de France Féminine and the UEFA Women's Champions League.

Ahead of the 2021-22 season, it was announced that Olivier Echouafni would leave the club after three seasons in charge with former Nice men's manager Didier Ollé-Nicolle replacing him as manager.

Kits

Competitions

Overall record

Division 1 Féminine

League table

Results summary

Results by round

Matches

Coupe de France

Trophée des Championnes

PSG qualified for the Trophée des Championnes by winning the 2020–21 Division 1 Féminine, but the match was cancelled due to the ongoing impacts of the COVID-19 pandemic in France.

UEFA Champions League

Group stage

The group stage draw was held on 13 September 2021.

Knockout phase

The draw for the knockout phase was held on 20 December 2021.

Quarter-finals

Paris Saint-Germain won 4–3 on aggregate.

Semi-finals

Lyon won 5–3 on aggregate.

References

Paris Saint-Germain Féminine seasons